The 2000 World Table Tennis Championships – men's team (Swaythling Cup) was the 45th edition of the men's team championship.  

Sweden won the gold medal defeating China 3–2 in the final. Japan and Italy won bronze medals.

Medalists

Final stage knockout phase

Quarter finals

Semifinals

Final

See also
 List of World Table Tennis Championships medalists

References

-